Jimmy Nelson may refer to:

Sports
Jimmy Nelson (footballer) (1901–1965), Scottish international footballer
 Jimmy Nelson (rugby union, born 1903) (1903–1981), Scotland international rugby union player
Jimmy Nelson (American football) (1919–1986), American football player
Jimmy Nelson (rugby union) (1921–2014), Irish rugby union international
Jimmy Nelson (baseball) (born 1989), American baseball player

Other
Jimmy Nelson (singer) (1919–2007), American blues singer
Jimmy Nelson (ventriloquist) (1928–2019), American ventriloquist
Jimmy Nelson (photographer) (born 1967), British photo-journalist

See also
Jim Nelson (disambiguation)
James Nelson (disambiguation)